is a railway station in Tarami-chō, Isahaya, Nagasaki Prefecture, Japan. It is operated by JR Kyushu and is on the Nagasaki Main Line. From here, in the direction of Nagasaki, line splits into the "new line" (inland route via ) and the "old line" (coastal route via ).

Lines

Station layout 
The station consists of a side and an island platform serving three tracks. The station building, a timber structure, houses  a waiting area and a ticket window. Access to the opposite side platform is by a footbridge served by elevators.

Management of the station has been outsourced to the JR Kyushu Tetsudou Eigyou Co., a wholly owned subsidiary of JR Kyushu specialising in station services. It staffs the ticket window which is equipped with a Midori no Madoguchi facility.

Adjacent stations

History
Kikitsu was opened on the same day as an intermediate station along the new track. When the Kyushu Railway was nationalized on 1 July 1907, Japanese Government Railways (JGR) took over control of the station. On 12 October 1909, track from Tosu through Haiki, Ōmura, Kikitsu, Nagayo to Nagasaki was designated the Nagasaki Main Line. On 2 October 1972, Kikitsu became a junction station when a shorter inland bypass route was opened between Kikitsu through  to Urakami. This became known as the new line or Ichinuno branch of the Nagasaki Main Line. The section to Nagayo became known as the old line or the Nagayo branch. With the privatization of Japanese National Railways (JNR), the successor of JGR, on 1 April 1987, control of the station passed to JR Kyushu.

Passenger statistics
In fiscal 2016, the station was used by an average of 1,868 passengers daily (boarding passengers only), and it ranked 98th  among the busiest stations of JR Kyushu.

Environs
Isahaya City Office Tarami Branch (Former Tarami Town Office)
Tarami Post Office
Seiryo High School
Soseikan High School and Junior High School

See also
 List of railway stations in Japan

References

External links
Kikitsu Station (JR Kyushu)

Railway stations in Nagasaki Prefecture
Railway stations in Japan opened in 1898
Nagasaki Main Line
Railway stations in Saga Prefecture